Tsebona is a genus of the plant family Sapotaceae described as a genus in 1962.

There is only one known species, Tsebona macrantha, endemic to Madagascar.

References

Sapotoideae
Endemic flora of Madagascar
Monotypic Ericales genera
Sapotaceae genera
Taxa named by René Paul Raymond Capuron